Tracks of My Years is the twelfth studio album by Canadian singer-songwriter Bryan Adams. The covers album was released on September 30, 2014 by Polydor Records. It is an eclectic mix of songs reflective of the time when rock was played alongside pop, country and R&B, and follows Adams’ acoustic album, 2010's Bare Bones, a release that resulted in sold out shows across Europe, North America, Australia and South Africa.

The track list features 10 covers, including "Lay Lady Lay" (Bob Dylan), "I Can't Stop Loving You" (Ray Charles) and "Any Time at All" (The Beatles). The album also includes "She Knows Me", an original song written by Adams and Jim Vallance, which was released as the album's only single.

Background
Adams said of Tracks of My Years: "Making the selection of the songs for the album took a long time. We recorded all kinds of songs until the songs sort of presented themselves, or sounded different enough from the originals. We did about three months of recording, spread out over the course of two years."

The album was mainly produced by David Foster and Adams. In 2016, Adams said he was "reluctant" to record a covers album, but his label Polydor wanted him to do it. Adams said, "I got into it in the end. And David is a brilliant producer — nothing against him. It just wasn’t something I really wanted to do." Adams simultaneously worked with producer Jeff Lynne on his thirteenth studio album, Get Up, which was released in 2015. Adams said of the process: "I would literally leave one studio where I was recording the covers with David Foster, and go to another studio where I was working on the new album with Jeff. That gave me the impetus to get through the Foster record, because I didn’t enjoy that at all."

Commercial performance
The album debuted at number one on the Canadian Albums Chart, selling 14,000 copies in its first week and at number 22 in Italy. In the US, the album debuted at number 89 on the Billboard 200, selling 4,000 copies in its first week. The album has sold 14,000 copies in the US as of September 2015.

Track listing

Charts

Certifications

References

2014 albums
Bryan Adams albums
Polydor Records albums
Covers albums